Villefranche-de-Lauragais (Languedocien: Vilafranca de Lauragués) is a commune in the Haute-Garonne department in southwestern France. Villefranche-de-Lauragais station has rail connections to Toulouse, Carcassonne and Narbonne.

Population
The inhabitants of the commune are known as Villefranchois in French.

See also
Communes of the Haute-Garonne department

References

Communes of Haute-Garonne